Polyquaternium-7 is an organic compound in the polyquaternium class of chemicals and used in the personal care industry. It is the copolymer of acrylamide and the quaternary ammonium salt diallyldimethylammonium chloride.

Its molecular formula is: (C8H16ClN)n(C3H5NO)m.

Functions 
Polyquaternium-7 is used for its antistatic and film forming properties.

Usage 
Polyquaternium 7 is the designation established with the original association, Cosmetics, Toiletries, and Fragrance Association (CTFA), now known as the Personal Care Products Council. There are an abundance of product names containing the same or a similar active ingredient for applications outside the cosmetics and personal care industry.

Polyquaternium-7 is applied in waste treatment for laundry, emulsion breaking, sludge dewatering and drainage and retention aid. It is a cationic polyelectrolyte.

Polyquaternium-7 is used as modifier, for example in shampoo, hair conditioner, hair spray, mousse, soap, gel, styling agent, shaving product, deodorant and antiperspirant. The DADMAC monomer is highly hydrophilic. Absorption of moisture from the air lends "conditioning" properties to the products that contain the copolymer such as shampoos, hair and skin conditioners and other personal care products including some bar soaps.

Safety 
According to its safety data sheet, it is not persistent, bioaccumulative, or toxic. Not a hazardous substance or mixture according to Regulation (EC) No. 1272/2008 or EC-directives 67/548/EEC or 1999/45/EC.

Scientific studies 
The influence of the synthetic cationic polymer polyquaternium-7 on the rheology and microstructure of creams was investigated.

Efficacy, mechanism and test methods of conditioning polymers in some shampoo formulations was investigated.

References 

Cosmetics chemicals
Organic polymers
Quaternary ammonium compounds